Old Funeral was a black/death metal band from Bergen, Norway.

History
Old Funeral was one of the first bands to form in the Norwegian extreme metal scene, formed in 1988. By 1992, the band had already dissolved. Since the breakup, many members (such as Abbath and Demonaz of Immortal, and Varg Vikernes, in Old Funeral as Kristian Vikernes, of Burzum) are now quite famous as members of the early Norwegian black metal scene. On 15 November 2015, Old Funeral reunited to perform at Blekkmetal 2015 in Bergen, Norway.

Members

Final Line-Up
 Olve Eikemo ("Abbath") – bass, vocals (1988–1990, 2015)
 Tore Bratseth – guitar (1988–1992, 2015)
 Jan Atle Åserød ("Padden") – drums (1988–1992, 2015), vocals (1990-1992; 2015)

Previous Members
 Harald Nævdal ("Demonaz") – guitar (1988–1989)
 Kristian Vikernes ("Varg Vikernes") – guitar (1989–1991)
 Jørn Inge Tunsberg – guitar (1991–1992)
 Thorlak Sigvaldason – bass (1991–1992)

Timeline

Discography
 The Fart that Should Not Be  (demo, self-released, 1989)
 Abduction of Limbs (demo, self-released, 1990)
 Devoured Carcass (EP, Thrash Records, 1991)
 The Older Ones (compilation, Hammerheart Records, 1999)
 Join the Funeral Procession (compilation, Hammerheart Records, 1999)
 Grim Reaping Norway (live album, Hearse Records, 2002)
 Our Condolences 1988–1992 (compilation, Soulseller Records, 2013)
 Old Coffin Days (compilation; A Fine Day To Die Records, 2020)

References

Norwegian black metal musical groups
Norwegian death metal musical groups
Musical groups from Bergen
Musical groups established in 1988
1988 establishments in Norway
Musical groups disestablished in 1992
1992 disestablishments in Norway